The Best of Lou Reed & The Velvet Underground is a compilation of some of Lou Reed's and some of The Velvet Underground's songs. It was released in 1995, but not in the U.S.

Track listing
"Sunday Morning" (from The Velvet Underground & Nico, 1967)
"I'm Waiting for the Man" (from The Velvet Underground & Nico)
"Venus in Furs" (from The Velvet Underground & Nico)
"Candy Says" (from The Velvet Underground, 1969)
"Pale Blue Eyes" (from The Velvet Underground)
"Beginning to See the Light" (from The Velvet Underground)
"Satellite of Love" (from Transformer, 1972)
"Nowhere at All" (non-album song recorded in 1975)
"Vicious" (from Transformer)
"Perfect Day" (from Transformer)
"Walk on the Wild Side" (from Transformer)
"How Do You Think It Feels" (from Berlin, 1973)
"Sweet Jane" (live) (from Rock 'n' Roll Animal, 1974)
"White Light/White Heat" (live) (from Rock 'n' Roll Animal, 1974)
"Sally Can't Dance" (from Sally Can't Dance, 1974)
"Wild Child" (from Lou Reed, 1972)
"I Love You" (from Lou Reed)
"Berlin" (from Berlin)
"Coney Island Baby" (from Coney Island Baby, 1976)
"I Love You, Suzanne" (from New Sensations, 1984)

Certifications
UK-Gold

References

1995 greatest hits albums
Albums produced by John Cale
Albums produced by Lou Reed
Albums produced by Maureen Tucker
Albums produced by Sterling Morrison
Lou Reed compilation albums
The Velvet Underground compilation albums